Grasmere may refer to:

Australia 
Grasmere, New South Wales
Grasmere, Western Australia, a suburb of Albany

Canada 
Grasmere, British Columbia
Grasmere, Ontario

New Zealand 
 Grasmere, New Zealand, in Invercargill
 Lake Grassmere

United Kingdom 
 Grasmere (lake), Cumbria, England
 Grasmere (village),  Cumbria, England
 Grasmere Road Ground, Hampshire

United States 
 Grasmere, New Hampshire
 Grasmere (Rhinebeck, New York), a former estate of Chancellor Livingston
 Grasmere, Staten Island, New York
 Grasmere (Staten Island Railway station)
 Grasmere, Idaho, a ghost town
 Grasmere, a neighborhood of Fairfield, Connecticut